Szklary may refer to the following places in Poland:
Szklary, Kłodzko County in Lower Silesian Voivodeship (south-west Poland)
Szklary, Ząbkowice Śląskie County in Lower Silesian Voivodeship (south-west Poland)
Szklary, Lesser Poland Voivodeship (south Poland)
Szklary, Krosno County in Subcarpathian Voivodeship (south-east Poland)
Szklary, Rzeszów County in Subcarpathian Voivodeship (south-east Poland)
Szklary, Opole Voivodeship (south-west Poland)